Jamil Muhammad Muhammad (born 12 November 2000) is a Nigerian footballer who currently plays as a midfielder for Kano Pillars.

Career statistics

Club

Notes

References

2000 births
Living people
Nigerian footballers
Nigeria youth international footballers
Association football midfielders
Kano Pillars F.C. players
Nigeria Professional Football League players
Footballers from Enugu
Nigeria under-20 international footballers